Gerald Minor (born October 27, 1958) is a Canadian former professional ice hockey player who spent his entire NHL career with the Vancouver Canucks. Selected by the Canucks in the 1978 NHL Amateur Draft, Minor made his professional debut that year in the minor leagues, joining the Canucks in 1979. He spent five seasons playing for the Canucks and their minor league affiliates in the Central Hockey League and American Hockey League, and retired in 1987.

Playing career
He had a quick release and a natural touch around the net and was a steady role player in five NHL seasons with the Canucks, where he held the record for most shorthanded goals by a rookie in the 1980–81 season. Minor helped set the Vancouver record for fastest four goals in a game (done in 1 minute, 23 seconds), by scoring the first goal in a game vs. the Pittsburgh Penguins on November 26, 1980. He also set the Canucks' single-season record (since broken) for shorthanded goals with six in 1980–81. Minor missed most of 1981–82 season and start of 1982 playoffs with slight skull fracture, suffered during Vancouver's 1981 training camp, and with a broken left ankle - an injury suffered in Vancouver's January 10, 1982 game versus the Chicago Black Hawks. He scored one goal and three assists during the 1982 Stanley Cup Finals against the New York Islanders.

Career statistics

Regular season and playoffs

External links
 

1958 births
Living people
Canadian expatriate ice hockey players in the United States
Canadian ice hockey centres
Dallas Black Hawks players
Fort Wayne Komets players
Fredericton Express players
Ice hockey people from Saskatchewan
Indianapolis Checkers players
Muskegon Lumberjacks players
New Haven Nighthawks players
Nova Scotia Oilers players
Regina Pats players
Sportspeople from Regina, Saskatchewan
Vancouver Canucks draft picks
Vancouver Canucks players